Xu Jiankun (born October 8, 1986, in Changchun, Jilin) is a Chinese pair skater. His partner is Li Jiaqi and the two are the 2006 Chinese national bronze medalists. They placed seventh at the 2006 Four Continents Championships.

Competitive highlights (with Li Jiaqi)

External links
 

1986 births
Living people
Chinese male pair skaters
Figure skaters from Changchun
Asian Games medalists in figure skating
Figure skaters at the 2007 Asian Winter Games
Asian Games bronze medalists for China
Medalists at the 2003 Asian Winter Games
Competitors at the 2009 Winter Universiade